TBC1 domain family member 1 is a protein that in humans is encoded by the TBC1D1 gene.

TBC1D1 is the founding member of a family of proteins sharing a 180- to 200-amino acid TBC domain presumed to have a role in regulating cell growth and cell differentiation. These proteins share significant homology with TRE2 (USP6; MIM 604334), yeast Bub2, and CDC16 (MIM 603461) (White et al., 2000).[supplied by OMIM]

References

Further reading